Marie Louise Andrews (Newland; October 31, 1849 – February 7, 1891) was an American author and editor from Indiana. She was one of the founders of the Western Association of Writers, and served as its secretary from its organization until June 1888, when she retired. She wrote much in both verse and prose, but she never published her works in book form, and little of her work has been preserved.

Early life and education
Mary (later "Marie") Louise Newland was born in Bedford, Indiana, on October 31, 1849. She was the second daughter of Dr. Benjamin Franklin Newland (1821–1889) and Louisa Ann (Curry) Newland, who were educated and considered to be intellectuals. Her early life was spent in Bedford, where she was mainly educated in private schools. She was a student at Saint Mary-of-the-Woods, in St. Agnes' Hall, Terre Haute, Indiana, and at Hungerford Collegiate Institute, Adams, New York, which was destroyed by fire shortly before commencement, so that Andrews was not formally graduated. Andrews spoke French and German, and was familiar with Latin and modern language literature.

Career
In the winter of 1885–86, while working as an editor at the Indianapolis Herald, Andrews and other contributors to the paper, including John C. Ochiltree, Dr. James Newton Matthews, Richard Lew Dawson, and Dr. Henry William Taylor, became the founders of the Western Association of Writers movement, discussing the idea of a writers’ association publicly through the Herald's columns. Andrews, a co-founder of the association, served as its secretary from its organization until June, 1888, when she retired from the office. Among her acquaintances were many of the prominent writers of the Western United States, and at the annual conventions of the association, she was always a conspicuous member. She was also remembered as a brilliant conversationalist and an effective impromptu speaker.

The Western Association of Writers owed its organization and establishment largely to Andrews' indefatigable efforts. Andrews was not an author in the technical sense of having written a book, yet she gained a well-merited reputation as a ready and versatile writer of poems, essays, and sketches, contributing to various periodical publications. Her interest in literary work was much broader than a purely personal matter. The development of western literature, and its recognition by the country and the world at large, had been on her mind for some time before she was given the opportunity to demonstrate the practicability of her ideas in the association with which her name was closely identified. She foresaw the growth of literature in the west, and her ideas regarding that growth and of the best means of fostering it were embodied in the association. It served as a means of introducing scores of talented writers to the public. She was one of the most active promoters of the organization in its inception, and was one of its most steadfast friends through the years when its continuance seemed questionable.

Personal life
On May 15, 1875, she married Albert M. Andrews, then of North Vernon, Indiana. Soon afterwards, they moved to Connersville, Indiana where he worked in the pharmaceutical business. She was in Indianapolis for several winters, supervising the education of her son, Albert Charlton Andrews, who was her only child. 

Marie Louise Andrews died at Connersville on February 7, 1891.

"Compensation"
There are smiles in the morning and tears at night,
  The wide world over,
There are hopes in the morning and prayers at night
  For many a rover.

There are tears unwept and songs unsung,
  And human anguish keen,
And hopes and fears and smiles and tears,
  But the blessings fall between!

References

Attribution

Bibliography

External links
 
 

1849 births
1891 deaths
19th-century American poets
19th-century American newspaper editors
19th-century American women writers
People from Bedford, Indiana
American essayists
Women newspaper editors
American women essayists
American women poets
Wikipedia articles incorporating text from A Woman of the Century